Glossamia is a genus of freshwater fish in the family Apogonidae. The majority of the species are endemic to New Guinea, but G. aprion is also found in Australia.

Species 
The 11 recognized species in this genus are:
 Glossamia abo (Herre, 1935)
 Glossamia aprion (J. Richardson, 1842) (mouth almighty)
 Glossamia arguni Hadiaty & G. R. Allen, 2011 
 Glossamia beauforti (M. C. W. Weber, 1907) (Beaufort's mouth almighty)
 Glossamia gjellerupi (M. C. W. Weber & de Beaufort, 1929) (Gjellerup's mouth almighty)
 Glossamia heurni (M. C. W. Weber & de Beaufort, 1929)
 Glossamia narindica T. R. Roberts, 1978 (slender mouth almighty)
 Glossamia sandei (M. C. W. Weber, 1907) (Sande's mouth almighty)
 Glossamia timika G. R. Allen, Hortle & Renyaan, 2000 (Timika mouth almighty)
 Glossamia trifasciata (M. C. W. Weber], 1913) (three-barred mouth almighty)
 Glossamia wichmanni (M. C. W. Weber, 1907) (Wichmann's mouth almighty)

References

Apogoninae
Marine fish genera
Taxa named by Theodore Gill
Endemic fauna of New Guinea